Radbourne may refer to:

 Radbourne, Derbyshire, a village and civil parish in England
 Radbourne Hall, a country house
 Radbourne, Warwickshire, a civil parish near Ladbroke, Warwickshire, England
 Upper and Lower Radbourne, a former civil parish in the defunct Southam Rural District

See also
 Radbourn, a surname
 Rodbourne, a suburb of Swindon, Wiltshire, England